Santa Cruz Assembly constituency is one of the original Goa Legislative Assembly constituency seats in the Tiswadi Taluka of North Goa District in the State of Goa.  The other constituencies in Tiswadi are Panaji, Taleigao, St. Andre and Cumbarjua.

Santa Cruz is one of the Ilha(s) (Island(s)), the other being Chorão, Divar, St. Estevam and Vaxim.  The Portuguese conquered these lands as part of Velha Conquista and used it for spice trade principally and simultaneously for spiritual purposes this resulted in the establishment of Catholic faith in Goa.  In 1547, the Portuguese missionaries established the Santa Cruz Catholic Church (also known by its direct translation of Holy Cross Catholic Church). Hence, this constituency has been named as Santa Cruz constituency.  A landmark in Calapor/Santa Cruz is called Almacho Khuris (Cross of the Soul in Konkani).  This monument was built to commemorate the death of a patriotic Calaporkar.

Jack de Sequeira, widely known for his role in Goan statehood, held this seat between 1967 and 1980.

Members of Legislative Assembly

Election results

2022

2017

2012 result

See also
 List of constituencies of the Goa Legislative Assembly
 North Goa district

References

External links
  

Assembly constituencies of Goa
North Goa district